Basketball at the Pacific Games (previously known as the South Pacific Games) has been played since 1963. It has also been contested at the Pacific Mini Games and, from the games at Port Vila in 2017, under the 3x3 format.

Pacific Games

Men's tournament

Men's 3x3

Women's tournament

Women's 3x3

Medal table
These are the all time medal standings in Pacific Games basketball for both men and women in all formats of the game since 1963. Men's basketball has been contested since the inaugural games in 1963, while the women's tournament made its debut in the second games in 1966. The 3x3 format was added for both men and women in 2019.

Pacific Mini Games

Men

Women

Medals
Basketball was first played at the Pacific Mini Games in 1997. The 3x3 version was introduced for 2017.

See also
FIBA Oceania Championship

References

Sources

 
Pacific Games
Basketball competitions in Oceania between national teams
Pacific Games